Edward Ferrers may refer to:
Edward Ferrers (dramatist) (died 1564), English dramatist
Edward Ferrers (MP died 1639) (c. 1573–1639), MP for Tewkesbury, 1610–1611
Edward Bromfield Ferrers, Commander of the Ceylon Defence Force
Edward Ferrers (died 1535), MP for Warwickshire
Edward Ferrers (died 1564), MP for Warwick
George Ferrers (c. 1510–1579), or Edward Ferrers, courtier and writer